Sergio Casal and Emilio Sánchez were the defending champions, but did not play this year.

Tom Nijssen and Cyril Suk won the title, by defeating John Fitzgerald and Anders Järryd 6–3, 6–7, 6–3 in the final.

Seeds

Draw

Draw

References

External links
 Official results archive (ATP)
 Official results archive (ITF)

Doubles
1992 ATP Tour
Eurocard Open